Eagle's Nest, The Eagle's Nest, Eagle Nest, Eagles Nest or Eaglenest may refer to a bird nest for eagles.  

The terms may also refer to:

Geography

United States
Eagle Nest (Pink Hills, North Carolina), historic home
Eagle Nest, Michigan, an unincorporated community
Eagle Nest, New Mexico, a village in Colfax County, New Mexico
Eagle Nest camp, an Adirondack Great Camp on Eagle Lake in Blue Mountain Lake, New York
Eagle Nest Canyon or Mile Canyon, a canyon on the Rio Grande near Langtry, Texas
Eagle's Nest, William K. Vanderbilt II's estate in  Suffolk County, New York, now the Vanderbilt Museum
Eagle's Nest (Ambar, Virginia), historic home
Eagle's Nest (Bridgeport, Connecticut)
Eagle's Nest (Phoenix, Maryland), a historic home
Eagles' Nest (Robert Morris–Springfield), softball park in Springfield, Illinois
Eagle's Nest Airport (Virginia), a private airport near Waynesboro, Virginia, United States
Eagle's Nest Arena, venue of the 1984 Summer Olympics, Los Angeles, California
Eagle's Nest Sinkhole, underwater cave in Chassahowitzka Wildlife Management Area, Florida
Eaglenest, California or Rio Nido, a community
Eaglenest Entertainment Center, an attraction in Maggie Valley, North Carolina 
Eaglenest Mountain in Haywood County, North Carolina
Eagles Nest Township, St. Louis County, Minnesota, a township in northeast Minnesota
Eagles Nest Wilderness, a U.S. Wilderness located in the Gore Range of Eagle and Summit Counties, Colorado
North Eaglenest Mountain in Haywood County, North Carolina
The Eagle's Nest, the name of Cabot Yerxa's first home in Desert Hot Springs, California

Elsewhere
Adlerhorst ("Eagle's Nest"), Hitler's command complex near Bad Nauheim, Hesse, Germany
Eagle Nests Landscape Park, a protected area in Poland
Eagle’s Nest Park, a park and scenic outlook in Bancroft, Ontario, Canada
Eagle Nests Trail, a tourist trail in Poland
Eagle's Nest, County Donegal, a township in Inver, County Donegal, Ireland
Eagle's Nest (Hong Kong), a hill in Hong Kong
Eagle's Nest, Kerry, a corrie containing Ireland's highest lake at the north-east face of Ireland's highest mountain, Carrauntoohil
Eagle's Nest, a viewpoint at the Wyndcliff, Monmouthshire, Wales
Eagles Nest, the house in Zennor, Cornwall where the artist Patrick Heron lived
Eaglenest Range, a mountain range in British Columbia, Canada
Eaglenest Wildlife Sanctuary in India
Eagles Nest, Gauteng, a suburb of Johannesburg, South Africa
Eagles Nest, New Zealand, a complex of rental villas in the Bay of Islands, New Zealand
Fort Stražnik, a fortress in Montenegro, also known as Eagle's Nest
Kehlsteinhaus, known in English-speaking countries as the Eagle's Nest, an alpine retreat atop the Hoher Gohl built by the Nazi party near Berchtesgaden in the German Alps

Arts, entertainment, and media
Rescued from an Eagle's Nest, a 1907 film starring D.W. Griffith
"The Eagle's Nest", an episode of The New Avengers

See also
Aerie (disambiguation)
Eagle (disambiguation)
Eyrie (disambiguation)
Nest (disambiguation)